Helen Pearson is a science journalist, author and Chief Magazine Editor for the journal Nature, where she oversees the journalism and opinion content. She is the author of The Life Project, a book about the British birth cohort studies, a series of longitudinal studies which have tracked thousands of people since their birth.

Education 
Pearson obtained a Bachelor of Arts degree in Natural Sciences (Genetics) from the University of Cambridge in 1996. She was awarded her PhD in 1999 from the University of Edinburgh, for research completed at the Medical Research Council Human Genetics Unit. Her PhD thesis was on the role of the gene Pax6 in development of the cortex.

Career 
Pearson joined Nature in 2001 as a reporter. She has interviewed and written about many high-profile scientists and academics for Nature including Robert Langer, Lawrence Summers and Joe Thornton. She has written freelance articles in outlets including The Guardian and The Independent.

Pearson's book, The Life Project: The extraordinary story of our ordinary lives was published by Allen Lane in 2016 and is about the British birth cohort studies. The oldest of these studies, the National Survey of Health and Development (NSHD), started in 1946, and the series includes the National Child Development Study, established in 1958, the 1970 British Cohort Study and the Millennium Cohort Study of babies born in 2000-2001. Pearson also included in her book the Avon Longitudinal Study of Parents and Children, also known as Children of the 90s.

Appearances 
Pearson has given public lectures and talks at academic venues and literary and science festivals including the Edinburgh International Book Festival, the RSA, London School of Economics and Dartington Way with Words Literary Festival. She gave the keynote public lecture at the British Society for the History of Science conference in 2017.  

She has appeared on national and international radio including Radio 4’s Start the Week, and has written about science writing and journalism as a career option for scientists.

In 2017, she gave a TED talk based on her book, The Life Project.

Awards 
Pearson’s book, The Life Project was named best science book of the year by The Observer, was a book of the year for The Economist and was longlisted for the Orwell Prize, Highly Commended at the 2017 British Medical Association medical book awards and Highly Commended in the 2016 UK Medical Journalists’ Association Awards.

 2013 Winner, Medical Journalists’ Association Award For feature article Coming of Age
 2012 Winner Best Feature, Association of British Science Writers Award For feature article Study of a Lifetime
 2010 Winner Best Feature, Association of British Science Writers Award For feature article One Gene, Twenty Years
 2010 Winner, Wistar Science Journalism Award For feature article One Gene, Twenty Years

Published works 
The Life Project
What makes some people happy, healthy and successful – and others not?
Britain’s birth cohort studies are the envy of the world
Lab Girl by Hope Jahren – what a life in science is really like
The lab that knows where your time really goes
Prehistoric proteins: Raising the Dead
Children of the 90s: Coming of Age
Study of a Lifetime
One Gene, Twenty Years
Protein engineering: The fate of fingers
At-Home DNA Tests Are Here, But Doctors Aren't Celebrating

External links 
Official website

References 

Living people
British science journalists
British women journalists
Women science writers
1973 births